This is a List of New Mexico Lobos football players in the NFL Draft.

Key

Selections

References

New Mexico

New Mexico Lobos NFL Draft